The 1902 Detroit College Tigers football team  was an American football team that represented Detroit College (renamed the University of Detroit in 1911) as an independent during the 1902 college football season. In its first season under head coachEdward J. Ryan , the team compiled a 3–3 record and were outscored its opponents by a combined total of 33 to 32.  The team opened the season with an 11-0 loss to Michigan Agricultural.

Schedule

References

Detroit College Tigers
Detroit Titans football seasons
Detroit College Tigers football
Detroit College Tigers football